Jovan Đorđević (13 November 1826 – 9 April 1900) was a Serbian writer, dramatist, Minister of Education and the co-founder of the Novi Sad Serbian National Theatre in 1861, the National Theatre in Belgrade in 1868 and the Academy of Dramatic Art in 1870. He is most famous for writing the lyrics to the Serbian National anthem Bože pravde in 1872. He was also a member of Matica Srpska.

Biography
Jovan Đorđević was born in Senta, a town on the bank of the Tisa river in the region which eventually became Serbian Vojvodina, on 13 November 1826 (Julian Calendar) to merchant Filip and Ana (née Malešević) Đorđević. Jovan was baptized on 17 November of that year in the Serbian Orthodox Church of Archangel Michael, officiated by Very Reverend Georgije-Đuka  Popović, one of the most erudite clerics of his day in that region of Potisje, and author of Put u raj (The Road to Heaven), a book in praise of moral principles. The acting bug bit hard when he first appeared as a teenager in Hungarian and Serbian amateur theatricals in his hometown of Senta. He started his schooling in Senta, Novi Sad, Szeged, Temisvar, and Pest, where he was a Tekelijanum scholar (having received a stipend from the Sava Tekelija Endowment). Throughout high school (gymnasium) and university he pursued his chosen career as a professional actor and manager, appearing in hundreds of plays he himself organized in which he received a reputation of high versatility and originality. The 1848 Revolution interrupted his university education and he left Pest for Sombor where Grand Zupan Isidor Nikolić Dzaver (1806–1862) of Bačka first appointed him secretary of the town's municipal court house, and then a position of judicial clerk at Lugos. In 1852 he was appointed professor of a high school in Novi Sad. There Đorđević came to loggerheads with the school's administrators, who were against Vuk Karadžić's language reforms, and left his teaching post to become secretary of the Matica Srpska and editor of the learned society's magazine Letopis Matice Srpske in 1857. Two years later (1859), Danilo Medaković appointed Đorđević to position of co-editor (with Đorđe Popović) of Srpski Dnevnik. He eventually relinquished his position to Svetozar Miletić in 1861 and joined Dr. Jovan Andrejević Joles on their long, overdue project – the construction of the Serbian National Theatre in Novi Sad. With the new theatre Đorđević showed his interest in Serbian drama through the productions of plays by Đorđe Maletić, Jovan Sterija Popović, Matija Ban, Joakim Vujić, and others. In 1868 he founded the Serbian National Theatre in Belgrade, where he offered increasingly elaborate contemporary productions of Serbian and foreign playwrights and dramatists, like Stevan Sremac, Milorad Popović Šapčanin, Milovan Glišić, Svetislav Vulović, Kosta Trifković, Branislav Nušić, Imre Madách, József Katona, György Bessenyei, Schiller, Henrik Ibsen, Oscar Wilde, Émile Augier, Jules Sandeau, Eugène Marin Labiche, Victorien Sardou, Ivan Turgenev, Gogol, Maksim Gorky and other.

Belgrade at the time had a competing theatre, the Theatre on Đumruk, where Jovan Sterija Popović first produced his play "Death of Stephen Uroš III Dečanski of Serbia" in 1841. Đorđević also established the prestigious Academy of Dramatic Art (Glumačka akademija) first at the Serbian National Theatre before the school eventually moved to its present location, now accredited by the University of Belgrade's Faculty of Dramatic Arts. The teaching staff at its inception was composed of Jovan Đorđević and Aleksa Bačvanski, an international actor who also went by the name of Šandor Varhidi. Today it is regarded as one of the most renowned drama schools in Eastern Europe, and one of the oldest drama schools in the Balkans, having been founded in 1870. 

Later, Đorđević became a professor of general history at Belgrade's Grandes écoles. In 1893 he served for a short time as
Serbia's Minister of Culture under the Jovan Avakumović Administration, and Alexander I  of Serbia's tutor. He wrote poetry and translated and adapted many plays for the theatre. He compiled and prepared a Latin-Serbian, Serbian-Latin Dictionary, which he had worked on from 1882 to 1886. His best work is a theatrical
allegory Markova sablja (Marko's Sword) and the text (lyrics) to the hymn Bože pravde, with music by Davorin Jenko. 
 
He died in Belgrade on 9 April 1900.

Selected works
 Đorđević, J. (1881) Narodno pozorište u Beogradu. Pozorište, vol. 8, br. 8. pp. 30 
 Đorđević, J. (1882) Srpska himna, Složio u note za prvi glas sa pratnjom klavira Davorin Jenko. Srbadija, vol. II, sv. 3 
 Đorđević, M. J. (1884) Lira : sa 800 pozorišnih pesama. Pozorišna lira, Belgrade, (Zadruga štamparskih radenika),

See also
 Kosta Manojlović
 Petar Krstić
 Miloje Milojević
 Stevan Hristić
 Stevan Mokranjac
 Isidor Bajić
 Davorin Jenko
 Josif Marinković
 Nenad Barački
 Tihomir Ostojić
 Stefan Stratimirović
 Branko Cvejić
 Stefan Lastavica
 Stanislav Binički

References

External links
 

1826 births
1900 deaths
National anthem writers
Members of the Serbian Learned Society
People from Senta
Matica srpska
19th-century Serbian people
Serbian writers
Serbian educators